Vella is a genus of antlions in the family Myrmeleontidae. There are about five described species in Vella.

Species
These five species belong to the genus Vella:
 Vella americana (Drury, 1773) i c g b
 Vella assimilis (Banks, 1908) i c g
 Vella eggerti Esben-Petersen, 1928 i c g
 Vella fallax (Rambur, 1842) i c g b
 Vella flaccida Navás, 1917 i c g
Data sources: i = ITIS, c = Catalogue of Life, g = GBIF, b = Bugguide.net

References

Further reading

External links

 

Acanthaclisini
Articles created by Qbugbot
Myrmeleontidae genera